is a Japanese football player. He plays for Tokyo Musashino City FC.

Career
Ryoya Ueda joined to Yokogawa Musashino (currently; Tokyo Musashino City FC) in 2012. In 2014, he moved to J3 League club; FC Ryukyu. In 2016, he back to Tokyo Musashino City FC

Club statistics
Updated to 22 February 2017.

References

External links

1989 births
Living people
Chuo Gakuin University alumni
Association football people from Hokkaido
Japanese footballers
J3 League players
Japan Football League players
Tokyo Musashino United FC players
FC Ryukyu players
Hokkaido Tokachi Sky Earth players
Association football defenders